NXT TakeOver XXX (originally NXT TakeOver: Boston) was the 30th NXT TakeOver professional wrestling livestreaming event produced by WWE. It was held exclusively for wrestlers from the promotion's NXT brand division. The event took place on August 22, 2020, at Full Sail University in Winter Park, Florida as part of that year's SummerSlam weekend. It was also the final NXT TakeOver event to air exclusively on the WWE Network, as beginning with TakeOver 31 in October, the events also became available on traditional pay-per-view.

The event was originally scheduled to take place at the TD Garden in Boston, Massachusetts, but due to the COVID-19 pandemic, the city's Mayor Marty Walsh announced the suspension of all large-scale gatherings and that no permit would be issued for an event that could draw a large crowd before September 7. As such, the event was moved to NXT's home base of Full Sail University. It was the final NXT TakeOver event to be held at Full Sail, as beginning with TakeOver 31 in October, NXT's events were moved to the WWE Performance Center in Orlando, Florida and broadcast from a new setup dubbed the Capitol Wrestling Center.

Six matches were contested at the event, including one on the pre-show. In the main event, Karrion Kross defeated Keith Lee to win the NXT Championship. In the penultimate match, Io Shirai defeated Dakota Kai to retain the NXT Women's Championship. Other prominent matches included Damian Priest winning the vacant NXT North American Championship in a ladder match and Adam Cole defeating Pat McAfee which was McAfee's WWE in-ring debut.

Production

Background
TakeOver was a series of professional wrestling shows that began in May 2014, as WWE's NXT brand held their second WWE Network-exclusive event, billed as TakeOver. In subsequent months, the "TakeOver" moniker became the brand used by WWE for all of their NXT live specials. Titled for being the 30th NXT TakeOver event, TakeOver XXX was held on August 22, 2020, as a support show for that year's SummerSlam pay-per-view.

Impact of the COVID-19 pandemic
As a result of the COVID-19 pandemic that began affecting the industry in mid-March, WWE had to present the majority of its programming from a behind closed doors set. NXT's programming was held at NXT's home base of Full Sail University in Winter Park, Florida. This TakeOver event, as well as the following night's SummerSlam, were originally scheduled to take place at the TD Garden in Boston, Massachusetts. However, on May 8, 2020, Boston mayor Marty Walsh suspended all large-scale gatherings until September 7, effectively canceling WWE's planned events in the city. As a result, this TakeOver, which was originally titled "TakeOver: Boston", was also moved to Full Sail University and subsequently renamed to "TakeOver XXX" due to it being the 30th NXT TakeOver event.

Storylines

The event comprised six matches, including one on the Pre-Show, that resulted from scripted storylines, where wrestlers portrayed heroes, villains or less distinguishable characters in scripted events that built tension and culminated in a wrestling match or series of matches. Results were predetermined by WWE's writers on the NXT brand, while storylines were produced on their weekly television program, NXT.

On the July 22 episode of NXT, then double champion Keith Lee reflected on his career and all of the opportunities he had gotten and stated that he now wanted to pay it forward, so he voluntarily relinquished the NXT North American Championship to allow other wrestlers a chance at the title, while he would focus solely on defending the NXT Championship. As a result, NXT General Manager William Regal announced that there would be a series of triple threat matches set up as qualifiers for a five-man ladder match to be held at TakeOver XXX to crown a new North American Champion. That same night, Bronson Reed defeated Johnny Gargano and Roderick Strong to become the first to qualify for the match. The following week, Dexter Lumis joined Reed as the second person to qualify by defeating Finn Bálor and Timothy Thatcher, but was later ruled out due to an ankle injury. On the August 5 episode, Damian Priest joined Reed as the third person to qualify by defeating Oney Lorcan and NXT UK's Ridge Holland. Due to Lumis' injury, Regal announced two singles matches that would take place to fill Lumis' spot and determine the final two competitors. The wrestlers in those matches will be the ones who were neither pinned nor submitted in the triple threats. On the August 12 episode of NXT, Cameron Grimes joined Reed and Priest as the fourth person to qualify by defeating Kushida and the returning Velveteen Dream, the latter of whom turned heel after the match. The final two to qualify were Gargano and Dream by defeating Holland and Bálor, respectively.

On the July 22 episode of NXT, during Karrion Kross' match, NXT Champion Keith Lee showed up and checked on Kross' opponent after Kross won. The following week, Kross challenged Lee for the NXT Championship, stating that Lee's friends would suffer, and Lee accepted. On the August 12 episode, after Kross won his match, Kross and Lee signed the contract for the title match at TakeOver: XXX. After the two signed the contract, a fireball went out of the contract and into Lee.

On the July 15 episode of NXT, after Io Shirai's successful NXT Women's Championship defense, Dakota Kai attacked Shirai. On the August 5 episode of NXT, thanks to interference from The Robert Stone Brand's Mercedes Martinez, Kai defeated Ripley to earn an opportunity against Shirai at TakeOver XXX, after which Martinez attacked Ripley.

On July 23 during McAfee's radio program on CBS Sports Radio, Cole got into an altercation with McAfee, due to McAfee accusing Cole of hiding behind The Undisputed Era during his record 403-day NXT Championship reign and mocking Cole for his smaller stature, resulting in Cole cussing out McAfee and shoving a producer. On July 27, NXT head Triple H offered McAfee the opportunity to work things out with Cole on the August 5 episode of NXT. During the NXT Tag Team Championship match, which saw Imperium's Fabian Aichner and Marcel Barthel defend against Bobby Fish and Kyle O'Reilly, McAfee mocked Cole while serving as guest commentator and got into another altercation, which ended with McAfee punting Cole in the head while Cole was being restrained, before being thrown out of Full Sail University. The following day, Triple H issued a challenge to McAfee on Cole's behalf for a match at TakeOver XXX on ESPN's Get Up!, which McAfee later accepted in a video.

On the August 5 episode of NXT, Legado Del Fantasma (Joaquin Wilde and Raul Mendoza ambushed Breezango (Fandango and Tyler Breeze) and threw them into their van. Later that night, they dragged Fandango out. Breeze tried to make the save, but was overpowered. The following week, Santos Escobar defeated Breeze, after which, Legado attacked Breezango until Isaiah "Swerve" Scott made the save. On the August 19 episode, Legado Del Fantasma defeated Scott and Breezango. Later that night, a triple threat tag team match between Oney Lorcan and Danny Burch, Legado Del Fantasma, and Breezango was scheduled for the Pre-Show to determine the number one contenders for Imperium's (Fabian Aichner and Marcel Barthel) NXT Tag Team Championship.

Event

Pre-show
On the TakeOver XXX Pre-Show, Breezango (Fandango and Tyler Breeze) took Oney Lorcan and Danny Burch and Legado Del Fantasma (Joaquin Wilde and Raul Mendoza) in a triple threat tag team match to determine the number one contenders for the NXT Tag Team Championship. In the end, Breeze performed a Super Model Kick on Lorcan to win the match.

Preliminary matches
In the first match of the main show, Finn Bálor faced Timothy Thatcher. The match in itself was a highly technical matchup and Thatcher and Balor used a lot of submissions. Bálor won following a Coup de Grace and a 1916.

Next, the vacant North American Championship was decided in a five-way ladder match featuring Bronson Reed, Damian Priest, Cameron Grimes, Johnny Gargano, and the Velveteen Dream. Midway through the match, Reed performed a suicide dive onto Grimes, Gargano, and Priest, prompting Gargano's wife, Candice LeRae, to come out and check on her husband. Grimes was taken out of the match when Gargano used a  powerbomb on him from a ladder onto another ladder. Dream was thrown out into the audience on the concrete floor. LeRae would become more heavily involved in the match by preventing Grimes from grabbing the title. She also tried to stop Reed from grabbing the title as well, but suffered greatly once Reed jumped from the ladder with LeRae on his back, splashing Gargano. In the end, Priest shoved Gargano off the ladder and unhooked the belt to win the title.

Following this was the grudge match between Adam Cole and Pat McAfee. Things started off intense after McAfee dove to the outside, taking out Cole and the rest of The Undisputed Era, his own posse of NFL teammates, and several WWE officials and security. McAfee's advantage would dissipate over time after Cole locked him in a Figure four Leglock. McAfee would escape and hit his signature punt on Cole for a near fall. McAfee would counter a superplex attempt by Cole by flipping out and landing on his feet. McAfee also did a suicide dive from the top turnbuckle onto the Undisputed Era and other officials on the outside. However, in the end, it would be Cole who would pick up the victory following a Panama Sunrise.

In the penultimate match, Io Shirai defended the NXT Women's Championship against Dakota Kai. Kai started the match off strong with several kicks and lariats. Once Shirai started mounting offense, Kai escaped to the outside where her enforcer, Raquel González, stopped Shirai in her tracks, long enough for Kai to attack her from behind. Kai continued her advantage by targeting the arm of Shirai and hitting her with the Kairopractor for a near fall. Kai would then accidentally kick the ref, knocking him unconscious. Shirai capitalized with her patented Over-the-Moonsault, but was attacked by Gonzalez, who laid Shirai out with a Pumphandle Uranage. Kai capitalized and covered Shirai as the ref came to and started the count, only for Shirai to kick out at a 2 count. Moments later, Shirai would do a Moonsault on both Gonzalez and Kai outside the ring. Shirai would win the match by hitting Kai with yet another Over-the-Moonsault to retain the title. Afterwards, Shirai was attacked by Gonzalez, but was rescued by Rhea Ripley.

Main event
In the main event, Keith Lee defended the NXT Championship against Karrion Kross (accompanied by Scarlett). Soon after the bell rang, the fight was quickly taken to the outside, with Kross kicking Lee's arm in between the guard rail and plexiglass divider. Kross continued to wear Lee down with various submission holds, and even hit a Doomsday Saito for a near fall. Lee would eventually mount a comeback against Kross, countering an arm bar by lifting it into a powerbomb, and would nail Kross with the Spirit Bomb for a near fall. Kross  would mount a comeback by trapping Lee in the Kross Jacket and nearly made the champion pass out, but Lee would stay conscious and fight out of the hold. Lee attempted to go for a top rope maneuver, but would be met by Kross, who performed a top rope Doomsday Saito to pin Lee and win the NXT Championship for the first time in his career.

Aftermath
After the event ended, it was reported by WWE that Karrion Kross had suffered a separated shoulder during his main event match with Keith Lee. At SummerSlam, it was announced that Lee would be moving to Raw brand. On the following NXT, Kross announced that due to suffering that shoulder injury, he would not be medically cleared to defend the NXT Championship and thus relinquished the belt. As a result, Regal announced later that night that four former champions—Johnny Gargano, Finn Bálor, Adam Cole, and the returning Tommaso Ciampa—would compete on the September 1 "Super Tuesday" edition of NXT in a four-way 60-minute Iron Man match for the vacant NXT Championship.

Also on NXT, Breezango (Tyler Breeze and Fandango) defeated Imperium (Fabian Aichner and Marcel Barthel) to become the new NXT Tag Team Champions, their first titles in WWE.

Dakota Kai and Raquel González took on Rhea Ripley and Io Shirai and defeated them after interference from Mercedes Martinez. This would lead to a Steel Cage match between Ripley and Martinez at Night 2 of NXT Super Tuesday, where Ripley was victorious.

TakeOver XXX would be the final NXT TakeOver to air exclusively on the WWE Network, as beginning with TakeOver 31 on October 4, 2020, TakeOvers also became available on traditional pay-per-view. Additionally, TakeOver XXX was the final TakeOver to broadcast from Full Sail University, as also beginning with TakeOver 31, the events were moved to the WWE Performance Center in a setup dubbed the Capitol Wrestling Center, which was similar to WWE's bio-secure bubble, the WWE ThunderDome, that was utilized for Raw and SmackDown's events.

Results

Notes

References

External links
 

2020 WWE Network events
August 2020 events in the United States
NXT TakeOver
2020 in professional wrestling in Florida
Events in Florida
Professional wrestling in Winter Park, Florida
Impact of the COVID-19 pandemic on television